German submarine U-343 was a Type VIIC U-boat of Nazi Germany's Kriegsmarine during World War II. The submarine was laid down on 1 April 1942 at the Nordseewerke yard at Emden, launched on 21 December 1942 and commissioned on 18 February 1943 under the command of Leutnant zur See Wolfgang Rahn.

After training with the 8th U-boat Flotilla at Danzig, U-343 was transferred to the 3rd U-boat Flotilla, based at La Pallice in France, for front-line service on 1 November 1943, and then to the 29th U-boat Flotilla, based at Toulon on the Mediterranean coast, on 1 February 1944. On 10 March 1944, U-343 was sunk off Bizerte by depth charges from a British warship. All 51 of her crew members were lost with the U-boat.

Construction and Design

U-343 was ordered by the Kriegsmarine on 21 November 1940. She was laid down about eight months later at the Nordseewerke yard at Emden, on 1 April 1942. Just under eight months later, U-343 was launched from Emden on 21 December 1942. She was formally commissioned the next year on 18 February 1943. U-343 carried five  torpedo tubes (four located in the bow, one in the stern) and had one  deck gun with 220 rounds. She could also carry 14 torpedoes or 26 TMA mines and had a crew of 44-52 men.

Service history

First patrol
U-343 sailed from Kiel under the command of Oberleutnant zur See Wolfgang Rahn on 16 October 1943, stopping at Trondheim for three days before continuing out into the north Atlantic to join the "wolfpacks" 'Eisenhart 7' on 9 November and 'Schill 2' on 17 November. However, she made no successful attacks, before arriving at her new home port of La Pallice on 16 November after 26 days at sea.

Second patrol
U-343 left La Pallice on 26 December 1943, sailed around the coast of Spain and Portugal and into the Mediterranean Sea, passing through the Strait of Gibraltar on 5 January 1944.

At 20:30 on 7 January the U-boat was attacked by a Wellington bomber from No. 36 Squadron RAF. After dropping five depth charges, all of which missed, the plane was hit on the port wing by the U-boat's anti-aircraft fire and caught fire. The aircraft crashed into the sea, the pilot and navigator were killed. The remaining four crewmen were rescued by the Free Polish destroyer  the next day.

However, another Wellington of 36 Squadron arrived on the scene, and immediately attacked U-343. Its depth charges fell wide after the port engine was hit by the U-boat's AA fire, but it managed to reach Bône, Algeria, safely.

The next day, 8 January, at 21:40 a third Wellington of 36 Squadron located U-343 south-west of Cartagena, Spain, and brought two more Wellingtons from No. 179 Squadron RAF, based at Gibraltar, to attack. One aircraft dropped six depth charges, but was hit by AA fire on the port wing, which caught fire, and the aircraft crashed into the sea, killing five crewmen. Only the pilot survived, and was passed closely by the U-boat twice while in his dinghy. He was picked up by the destroyer  the next morning.

The attacks on the U-boat continued for several hours, and were augmented by the arrival of a Catalina flying boat from No. 202 Squadron RAF. It too was hit by AA fire, that damaged the port wing, fuselage and both fuel tanks, and wounded the flight engineer, forcing the aircraft to head for home.

The aircraft finally broke off the attack at 23:00 as U-343, badly damaged and unable to dive, managed to escape into the darkness with only one crewman wounded by strafing. After making repairs she was able to reach her new base at Toulon on 19 January.

Third patrol
U-343 left Toulon on 4 March 1944 and headed for the coast of Tunisia. There on 10 March 1944, north of Bizerte, in position , she was sunk by depth charges from the British minesweeping trawler HMS Mull with the loss of all 51 hands.

See also
 Mediterranean U-boat Campaign (World War II)

References

Bibliography

External links

1942 ships
World War II submarines of Germany
World War II shipwrecks in the Mediterranean Sea
German Type VIIC submarines
U-boats commissioned in 1943
U-boats sunk in 1944
U-boats sunk by British warships
U-boats sunk by depth charges
Ships built in Emden
Ships lost with all hands
Maritime incidents in March 1944